is a district located in Saga Prefecture, Japan. At the present it has only one town.

As of April 1, 2021, the district has an estimated population of 5,211 and a density of 145 persons per square kilometre.

Municipalities
Genkai, whose borders are effectively the same as Higashimatsuura District's.

History
 In 1878, Higashimatsuura District split with Matsuura District in Nagasaki Prefecture, along with Nishimatsuura District, Kitamatsuura District, and Minamimatsuura District.
 In 1883 Higashimatsuura District (along with Nishimatsuura District) became a part of Saga Prefecture.

Districts in Saga Prefecture